Douglas High School is a public high school in Douglas, Wyoming, United States, the county seat of Converse County.

Its mascot is the Bearcat, and its school colors are blue and white.

It won its third consecutive 3A State Football Championship in 2010.

It is one of four public schools in Douglas, a town of about 6,100 people, and part of Converse County School District 1. Other schools in the district include Primary (grades K–1, Douglas Intermediate School (grades 23), Douglas Upper Elementary (grades 4–5), and Douglas Middle School (grades 68).

References

External links
 Official website

Buildings and structures in Converse County, Wyoming
Douglas, Wyoming
Education in Converse County, Wyoming
Educational institutions in the United States with year of establishment missing
Public high schools in Wyoming